HuMo-genealogy  is a free and cross-platform web application for displaying and editing genealogical data on the Internet. HuMo-gen is written in PHP and is under the GPL-3.0-only license. HuMo-gen supports UTF-8 and is bi-directional.
The project was founded in 1999 by Huub Mons in the Netherlands. It is now developed by Huub Mons and Yossi Beck with contributions of other users.
Since March 2010 HuMo-gen is hosted on SourceForge.

Features
HuMo-gen is installed on a web server and uses a MySQL database to store the genealogical data. The webmaster can build entire family trees on-line with HuMo-gen's editing menu or choose to upload GEDCOM files that were created with an external genealogy program. A range of genealogical data can be recorded, such as names, dates, places, sources, witnesses, aliases and notes. One can also attach photos, documents and video clips.

As HuMo-gen is a web-based application, it may be installed on a PC on top of an Apache/PHP stack such as XAMPP

The webmaster can control the data that will be visible to the end-user, by creating several user groups. The default group is "guest" which requires no login and will usually have the most stringent privacy settings. Other groups can have different privacy settings that may allow for more details to be shown.

End-users may search the database and create several types of textual and graphical genealogical reports. Textual reports include ancestor, descendant and outline reports. Some of the reports may be exported as PDF. The program also includes a relationship calculator and Google maps integration. As of October 2011, end-users can choose from among 16 display languages. The program also allows the end-users to choose from among several skins.

References

External links
  
  
 Support Forum 
 

Free genealogy software
Cross-platform free software
Free software programmed in PHP
Free software projects
Web applications
Computer-related introductions in 1999